Giresun Province is a province of Turkey on the Black Sea coast. Its adjacent provinces are Trabzon to the east, Gümüşhane to the southeast, Erzincan to the south, Sivas to the southwest, and Ordu to the west.  Its license-plate code is 28.

The provincial capital is Giresun.

Geography

Giresun is an agricultural region and its lower areas, near the Black Sea coast. It is Turkey's second largest producer of hazelnuts and it is famously home to the best quality hazelnuts in the world; a Giresun folk song tells "I will not eat a single hazelnut, unless you are by my side," while another tells of a lover shot dead under a hazelnut tree.

Forests and pasture cover the high mountainous regions, and in places there is mining of copper, zinc, iron and other metals. The mountain villages are remote, with poor roads and little else in the way of infrastructure. The hillsides are too steep for most forms of agriculture, and as a result, cornbread is the traditional meal, as wheat cannot be grown.

The climate is typical of this stretch of the Black Sea coast, i.e. very wet. Local flora includes bilberries (Turkish "taflan").

Demographics 
The province is traditionally inhabited mostly by Chepni Turks as well as a minority of Cheveneburi Georgians in select rural villages and towns. 

Due to migration, more Giresunians live outside of Giresun than inside it.

Districts

Giresun province is divided into 16 districts (capital district in bold):

Culture
Giresun province is culturally divided into two regions from north to south. North Giresun having virtually the same culture as the neighbouring Ordu and Trabzon, while south Giresun (aka. the Şebinkarahisar region) being much closer to the neighbouring Sivas province and the Central Anatolia region. Because of the northern part dominating much of the province's economic and demographic sides, south of the province is more often than not ignored.

Handcrafts
Due to the dense forestry in Giresun, woodwork is among the common handcrafts in the region. Some small wooden handcrafts peculiar to the city are churns, külek (a storing pot for cheese), and spoons. One of the oldest handcrafts in the city is weaving. Wool, linen threads and similar raw materials are spun in handlooms to produce various local clothes, heybe (shoulder bags) and bags. Strong threads and knitted threads are also produced in handlooms.

Cuisine
Some of the dishes peculiar to the city are corn soup (Mısır çorbası), kale soup (kara lahana çorbası or pancar çorbası), cabbage leaves stuffed with a meat filling (etli lahana sarması or pancar sarması/dolması), black cabbage dish (karalahana yemeği or pancar yemeği), pilaf with anchovy (hamsili pilav), pilaf with cabbage (dible), kaygana, kuymak (made of cheese, cornmeal and butter)

Places of interest

 Kuşköy, ("Village of the Birds") known for its famous for its 400-year-old whistled language that is used by the local residents.
 Kırkharman Kilisesi, a former Greek church also known as the Church of Prophet Elias.
Kümbet, Karagöl and Bektaş are areas of an attractive mountain pasture in the district of Dereli, where people can enjoy walks and picnics. Annual folklore festivals are held here in summer.
 Çakrak Kilisesi

Notable residents

Politicians
 Rahşan Ecevit (1923, Bursa - 2020), wife of former Turkish Prime Minister, Bülent Ecevit, born to a Şebinkarahisar family
 Hayrettin Erkmen (b Tirebolu - ), former foreign minister
 Harun Karadeniz (1942, Alucra - 1975), writer and student activist leader of the 1968 generation
 İdris Küçükömer (1925, Giresun - 1987), economist and thinker
 Topal Osman (1883, Giresun - 2 Nisan 1923, Ankara), soldier and commander in the Turkish War of Independence
 Mustafa Suphi (1883, Giresun - 1921), founder of the Communist Party of Turkey
 Naim Tirali (1925, Giresun - ), journalist and politician
 Hasan Âli Yücel (1897, İstanbul – 1961), poet, thinker, and politician, former minister of education, born to a Görele family

Writers and artists
 Kadir Çelik (b Görele ), TV producer and presenter
 Hulki Cevizoğlu (b 1958, Giresun - ), journalist, TV presenter and producer, specialises in political debate
 Bedri Rahmi Eyüboğlu (1913, Görele - 1975, Istanbul), painter and poet
 Hamit Görele (1903, Görele - 1980, Istanbul), painter
 Ergin Günçe (1938, Giresun - 1983), poet
 İlyas İlbey, actor, husband of Yasemin Yalçın
 Şafak Karaman (b 1967, Trabzon - ), minor celebrity and TV presenter, born to a Tirebolu family
 Fatih Kırtorun (1985, Görele - ), writer and poet
 Salih Memecan (1952, Giresun - ), cartoonist of Sabah newspaper
 Fethi Naci (1927, Giresun - ), writer and critic
 Aziz Nesin (1915, Şebinkarahisar - 1995), writer and journalist
 Yaman Okay (b 1951, Giresun -), actor and film director
 Öztürk Serengil,  well-known film actor, father of Seren Serengil, grew up in Giresun
 Ahmet Yalçınkaya (b 1963, Giresun ), poet
 İlker Yasin, Kanal Ds football commentator

Musicians
Giresun province shares the folk music of the Black Sea region and is the birthplace of:
 Picoğlu Osman (b. 1901, Görele - d. 1946 Amasra), folk musician, considered to be one of the best kemençe players
 Katip Şadi (b 1932, Görele -), folk musician, kemençe player

Other musicians include:
 Ozan Arif (1949, Alucra - ), poet, lyricist, balladeer of the extreme right MHP
 Bahadır Aydoğan, Arabesk style singer
 Mustafa Küçük, folk-arabesk musician
 Gökhan Semiz (1968, Istanbul - 1998 İstanbul), member of the pop music group Group Vitamin; family from Giresun
 Teoman (1967, Alucra - ), rock singer

Sports people
 Şenes Erzik (1942, Giresun -), businessman and vice president of UEFA
 Hasan Gemici, 1952 Olympic gold medalist in freestyle wrestling
 Giresunspor,  a 1st (Süper Lig) league football team
 Tolga Seyhan (b 1977 -) and Gökdeniz Karadeniz (b 1980 Giresun, currently with Rubin Kazan), footballers

Giresun in popular culture
 The TV series Uy Başuma Gelenler was filmed in the village of Düzköy. It is the story of a young man from Istanbul who inherits a hazelnut grove in Giresun (a Turkish twist on Monarch of the Glen).
 The folk song "Giresun üstünde vapur bağrıyor" ("Eşref Bey Ağıtı") has been recorded by a number of artists including Ismail Hakkı Demircioğlu, and tells of a wounded soldier dying in Giresun.
 "Giresun'un içinde" has been sung by Musa Eroğlu, Selda Bağcan and Fuat Saka, who also sang "Lazutlar," which means corn in the local dialect and is a kind of Cider with Rosie rural idyll in verse.
 Ahmet Kaya sang "Mican," a ballad about a local bandit in the mountains.

See also
List of populated places in Giresun Province

References

External links
  All about Giresun and its hinterland
  
  Giresun Kültür
  Local news
  Local information website
   
  Giresun

 
Chepni people